Ursula Southeil ( 1488 – 1561; also variously spelt as Ursula Southill, Ursula Soothtell or Ursula Sontheil), popularly known as Mother Shipton, is said to have been an English soothsayer and prophetess.

She has sometimes been described as a witch and is associated with folklore involving the origin of the Rollright Stones of Oxfordshire, reportedly a king and his men transformed to stone after failing her test. William Camden reported an account of this in a rhyming version in 1610.

The first known edition of her prophecies was printed in 1641, eighty years after her reported death. This timing suggests that what was published was a legendary or mythical account. It contained numerous mainly regional predictions and only two prophetic verses.

One of the most notable editions of her prophecies was published in 1684. It gave her birthplace as Knaresborough, Yorkshire, in a cave now known as Mother Shipton's Cave. The book reputed Shipton to be hideously ugly, and that she had married Toby Shipton, a local carpenter, near York in 1512, and told fortunes and made predictions throughout her life.

Personal life 
Mother Shipton was born Ursula Sontheil, in 1488 to 15-year-old Agatha Soothtale, in a cave in North Yorkshire outside of the town Knaresborough. The earliest sources of the legends of her birth and life were collected in 1667 by author and biographer Richard Head and later by J. Conyers in 1686.

Both sources—1667 and 1686—state that Shipton was born during a violent thunderstorm, and was deformed and ugly, born with a hunchback and bulging eyes. The sources also state that Shipton cackled instead of crying after having been born, and as she did so, the previously raging storms ceased.

The sources report Ursula's mother Agatha as a poor and desolate 15-year-old orphan, left with no means to support herself; having fallen under the influences of the Devil, Agatha engaged in an affair, resulting in the birth of Ursula. Variations of this legend claim Agatha herself was a witch and summoned the Devil to conceive a child.

The true origin of Ursula's father is unknown, with Agatha refusing to reveal him; at one point, Agatha was forcibly brought before the local magistrate, but still refused to disclose his identity. The scandalous nature of Agatha's life and Ursula's birth meant the two were ostracised from society and forced to live alone, in the same cave Ursula was born, for the first two years of Ursula's life. Rumours that Agatha was a witch and Ursula the spawn of Satan were perpetuated, due to the cave's well-known skull-shaped pool, which turned things to stone. The cave is known today as Mother Shipton's Cave; though the effects of the cave's pool are not those of true petrification, they closely resemble the process by which stalactites are formed, coating objects left in the cave with layers of minerals, and in essence hardening porous objects until they become hard and stone-like.

According to 17th-century sources, after two years living alone in the Forest of Knaresborough, the abbot of Beverley intervened. The abbot removed them from the cave and secured Agatha a place in the Convent of the order of St. Bridget in Nottinghamshire, and Ursula a foster family in Knaresborough. Agatha and Ursula would never see each other again.

Developed from contemporary descriptions and depictions of her, it is likely Ursula had a large crooked nose and suffered from a hunchback and crooked legs. Physical differences acted as a visual reminder of the secretive events of her birth and the townspeople never forgot. She found acceptance with her foster family and a few friends, but Ursula was ultimately ostracised from the larger portion of people in town. She found sanctuary in the woods like her mother had and spent most of her childhood learning of plants and herbs and the medicinal properties of them.

Legends of her childhood 
It was claimed that when Ursula was two years old, she was left alone at home while her foster mother left to run errands. Her mother returned to find the front door wide open. Afraid of what might still be in the house, she called to her neighbours for assistance, and the group heard a loud wailing, like "a thousand cats in consort" throughout the house. Ursula's cradle was found empty. After a frantic search throughout the house, her mother looked up to see Ursula naked and cackling, perched on top of the iron bar where the pot hooks were fastened above the fireplace.

The source dating to 1686 tells of an event where the chief members of the parish were gathered together in a meeting. Ursula walked past the group running an errand for her mother, and the men stopped to mock her, calling out "hag face" and "The Devil's bastard". Ursula kept walking to continue her errands but as the men sat back down, the ruff on the neck of one of the principal yeomen transformed and a toilet seat clapped down around his neck. The man next to him began to laugh, and as he did the hat he was wearing was suddenly replaced with a chamber pot. The gathered members of the parish began to laugh loudly enough that the Master of the house came running to see what was happening; when he tried to run through the door, he found himself blocked by a large pair of horns that had grown suddenly from his head. The source reports that the strange occurrences reverted to normal shortly afterwards, and that the townspeople took them as a sign not to publicly mock Ursula.

Adulthood 

As Ursula grew so did her knowledge of plants and herbs and she became an invaluable resource for the townspeople as a herbalist. The respect she earned from her work gave her the opportunity to expand her social circle and it was then she met the local carpenter Toby Shipton.

When Ursula was 24 years old she and Toby Shipton were married. From this point on Ursula adopted her husband's surname and became Mother Shipton. The people in town were shocked at their union and whispered of how he must have been bewitched to marry her.

About a month into her marriage a neighbour came to the door and asked for her help, saying she had left her door open and a thief had come in and stole a new smock and petticoat. Without hesitation Mother Shipton calmed her neighbour and said she knew exactly who stole the clothing and would retrieve it the next day. The next morning Mother Shipton and her neighbour went to the market cross. The woman who had stolen the clothing couldn't stop herself from putting the smock on over her clothes, the petticoat in her hand, and marching through town. When she arrived at the market cross she began dancing and danced straight for Mother Shipton and her neighbour all the while singing "I stole my Neighbours Smock and Coat, I am a Thief, and here I show't." When she reached Mother Shipton she took off the smock, handed it over, curtsied and left.

Two years later, in 1514, Toby Shipton died, and the town believed Ursula to have been responsible for his death. The grief of losing her husband and the harsh words of the town prompted Ursula Shipton to move into the woods, and the same cave she had been born in, for peace. Here she continued to create potions and herbal remedies for people. Mother Shipton's name slowly became more and more well known, and people would travel far distances to see her and receive potions and spells.

As her popularity grew she grew bolder and revealed she could see the future. She started by making small prophecies involving her town and the people within, and as her prophecies came true she began telling prophecies of the monarchy and the future of the world. In 1537 King Henry VIII wrote a letter to the Duke of Norfolk where he mentions a "witch of York", believed by some to be a reference to Shipton.

Prophecies 
"Water shall come over Ouse Bridge, and a windmill shall be set upon a Tower, and a Elm Tree shall lie at every man's door".Martha, Robert Nixon, and Shipton. "The Life and Prophecies of Mother Shipton". Chapter. In Prophecies of Robert Nixon, Mother Shipton, and Martha, the Gipsy, 103–96. London: Published for the booksellers, 1866.The River Ouse was the river next to York, and Ouse Bridge was the bridge over the river. This prophecy meant nothing to the people of York until the town got a piped water system. The system brought water across Ouse Bridge in pipes to a windmill that drew up the water into the pipes. The pipes they used were made out of Elm trees and the pipes came to every man's door delivering water throughout the town."Before Ouse Bridge and Trinity Church meet, what is built in the day shall fall in the night, till the highest stone in the church be the lowest stone of the bridge."Not long after Mother Shipton uttered this prophecy did a huge storm fall on York. During the storm the steeple on the top of Trinity Church fell and a portion of the Ouse Bridge was destroyed and swept away by the river. Later when making repairs to the bridge, pieces that had previously been the steeple of the church were used as the foundation of the new section of the bridge. Effectively making Trinity Church and the Ouse Bridge what was built in the day and fell in the night, and the steeple from Trinity Church, the highest stone, be the foundation of the bridge, the lowest stone of the bridge.

Prophecy of Henry the Eighth 
"When the cow doth ride the bull, then, priest, beware the skull. And when the lower shrubs do fall, the great trees quickly follow shall. The mitered peacock's lofty cry shall to his master be a guide. And one great court to pass shall bring what was never done by any king. The poor shall grieve to see that day and who did feast must fast and pray. Fate so decreed their overthrow, riches brought pride, and pride brought woe"."When the cow doth ride the bull, then, priest, beware the skull."Often when Mother Shipton would have visions of specific people she wouldn't see faces or names, but their family heraldry. The cow mentioned represents the heraldry of Henry VIII, and the bull similarly represents Anne Boleyn. Mother Shipton is marking the beginning of her prophecy to the marriage of King Henry VIII and Anne Boleyn. Once they are wed the priests need to beware. This is because their marriage marks the beginning of the dissolution of the monasteries, where King Henry VIII demobilised all monasteries, priories and convents in England. Many priests, both religious and secular, lost their lives for pressing against the laws made to limit the Catholic Church's power."The mitered peacock's lofty cry shall to his master be a guide."In late-15th-century and early-16th-century England, King Henry VIII was not the controlling force behind all policies and matters of state. The man who was the controlling figure in matters of state was the King's chief advisor Thomas Wolsey. Thomas Wolsey was the son of a butcher, who rose up and became Chancellor, and then a Cardinal of the Catholic Church. He was the King's chief advisor and a controlling figure in all matters of state, and Henry VIII's policies. Wolsey was even often depicted as an alter rex (other king) because his influence was so absolute in both political and religious spheres. In her prophecy Mother Shipton refers to him as a "mitered peacock". as he came from the lowly state of being the son of a butcher to controlling and guiding King Henry VII and all his policies for England."And one great court to pass shall bring what was never done by any king. "This portion of the prophecy refers to King Henry VIII seizing power from the Catholic Church and his creation of the Church of England, which had never been done by any king before."The poor shall grieve to see that day and who did feast must fast and pray. Fate so decreed their overthrow, riches brought pride, and pride brought woe".King Henry VIII wanted to take control of all the land and property owned by the monasteries in order to enrich himself. He did this by forcing the monasteries to surrender all their property, and then he dissolved, or abolished the monasteries and expelled the monks.  The poor were ultimately the ones that suffered, because the monasteries had been the source of most charity, and fed and gave alms to the poor.  With the monasteries all abolished, all of the former funds used for charity went into the king's treasury instead of being used to help the poor.

Mother Shipton then says this fall of the church was inevitable; as the church became more wealthy they became more prideful. Their lack of humility had ultimately led to their downfall.

Prophecy of the end of times 

The most famous claimed edition of Mother Shipton's prophecies foretells many modern events and phenomena. Widely quoted today as if it were the original, it contains over a hundred prophetic rhymed couplets. But the language is notably non-16th century. This edition includes the now-famous lines:The world to an end shall come
In eighteen hundred and eighty one.

This version was not published until 1862. More than a decade later, its true author, Charles Hindley, admitted in print that he had created the manuscript.

This fictional prophecy was published over the years with different dates and in (or about) several countries. The booklet The Life and Prophecies of Ursula Sontheil better known as Mother Shipton (1920s, and repeatedly reprinted) predicted the world would end in 1991. (In the late 1970s, many news articles were published about Mother Shipton and her prophecy that the world would end—these accounts said it would occur in 1981.)

Among other well-known lines from Hindley's fictional version (often quoted as if they were original) are:

<blockquote>
<poem>
A Carriage without a horse shall go;Disaster fill the world with woe...
In water iron then shall float,As easy as a wooden boat.</poem></blockquote>

 Historicity 

Based on contemporary references to her and countless resources detailing the events of her life, historians believe Mother Shipton was a real woman, born in 1488 to an orphan fifteen-year-old girl named Agatha Soothtale in a cave in North Yorkshire outside of the town Knaresborough. Based on how every contemporary record of her from the time references her appearance, she probably suffered from a hunchback and a large crooked nose, although much else regarding her appearance is conjecture. She made potions, herbal remedies, cast spells and prophesied the future.

In reference to her existence, in 1537 Yorkshire, while Catholic people were rebelling against the dissolution of Catholic monasteries, Henry VIII wrote a letter to the Duke of Norfolk where he refers to a "witch of York". It is believed that this letter is the earliest reference to the real Mother Shipton who would have been prophesying about Henry VIII at this time. In 1666 Samuel Pepys recorded in his diaries that, whilst surveying the damage to London caused by the 1666 Great Fire in the company of the Royal family, he heard them discuss Mother Shipton's prophecy of the event.

The earliest account of Mother Shipton's prophecies was published in 1641, eighty years after her death. The story goes that the document of Mother Shipton's life was recorded by a woman named Joanne Walker who heard the story as a young girl and transcribed it as Mother Shipton spoke of her life. Mother Shipton never wrote anything down or published anything during her lifetime.

The cave where she lived is known as England's oldest tourist attraction and for hundreds of years people have trekked to see the cave where she was born. This cave's water has a mineral content so high anything placed in the pool will slowly be covered in layers of stone. Tourists will place items in the pool to later return and see it turned to stone. It is assumed that many of her prophecies were never written down, and many legends and prophecies accredited to her were created after her death to enhance the folk legend she had become.

Legacy

The figure of Mother Shipton accumulated considerable folklore and legendary status. Her name became associated with many tragic events and strange goings-on recorded in the UK, North America and Australia throughout the 17th, 18th and 19th centuries. Many fortune-tellers used her effigy and statue, presumably for purposes of association marketing. Many English pubs were named after her. Only two survive, one near her purported birthplace in Knaresborough and the other in Portsmouth. The latter has a statue of her above the door.

A caricature of Mother Shipton was used in early pantomime. Her appearance in pantomime was mentioned in a song from Yorkshire that was transcribed in the 18th century, and which reads (in part): "Of all the pretty pantomimes/ That have been seen or sung in rhimes,/Since famous Johnny Rich's times,/There's none like Mother Shipton." 

The Mother Shipton moth (Callistege mi) is named after her. Each wing's pattern resembles a hag's head in profile.

A fundraising campaign was started in 2013 to raise £35,000 to erect a statue of Shipton in Knaresborough. Completed in October 2017, the statue sits on a bench in the town's Market Square close to a statue of John Metcalf, an 18th-century road engineer known as Blind Jack.

Mother Shipton is referred to in Daniel Defoe's A Journal of the Plague Year'' (1722), referring to the year 1665, when the bubonic plague erupted in London: 
"These terrors and apprehensions of the people led them into a thousand weak, foolish, and wicked things, which they wanted not a sort of people really wicked to encourage them to: and this was running about to fortune-tellers, cunning-men, and astrologers to know their fortune, or, as it is vulgarly expressed, to have their fortunes told them, their nativities calculated, and the like... And this trade grew so open and so generally practised that it became common to have signs and inscriptions set up at doors: 'Here lives a fortune-teller', 'Here lives an astrologer', 'Here you may have your nativity calculated', and the like; and Friar Bacon's brazen-head, which was the usual sign of these people's dwellings, was to be seen almost in every street, or else the sign of Mother Shipton...."

See also
 2012 phenomenon

Notes

References

External links

 
 Mother Shipton's Cave and Dropping Well
 Mother Shipton, Her Life and Prophecies, Mysterious Britain & Ireland

1488 births
1561 deaths
15th-century English people
15th-century English women
16th-century English women
Legendary English people
English psychics
People from Knaresborough
Prophets
Witchcraft in England
Witches in folklore
Women mystics
Yorkshire folklore